Madhav Borkar (also Borcar, in Konkani वेणी माधव बोरकर) is a noted Konkani poet, former station director of All India Radio and Konkani litterateur based in Goa, India.

Work, life
Borkar was earlier station director of All India Radio, Panaji  (Panjim). As a broadcaster, he has also worked in the government-run radio stations at Mumbai, Mangalore and Kolhapur.

In 2015, Borkar replaced Pundalik Narayan Naik as the president of the Goa Konkani Akademi. In March 2018, he completed 50 years in poetry, and has published eight volumes of verse.
He is married to Mankarnika and they have two children, daughter Yogini and son Chinmay.

Literary output
Borkar wrote poetry since 1968. His first collection was published while he was still a schoolboy.  At the age of 15, his Chanvar got into print.  He has six collections of poems and two translations -- Kabir by Prabhakar Machve and Ekshem Ek Kavita by Rabindranath Tagore.

His poetic works 
 Chanvar (The Bloom, 1969)
 Vatacheo Savalleo (The Shadows of Sunlight, 1972), 
 Uzvadacho Rookh (The Tree of Light, 1975),
 Parjallachem Daar (The Door to Brightness, 1986)
 Yaman (Yaman, 1999),
 Avyaktaachim Gaannim (Songs of the Unexpressed, 2002), 
 and Symphony (Symphony, 2012). 
 Molabachem Zonel.

Awards, etc.
Earlier in his writing career, he received the Indian Sahitya Akademi award in 2001 for Yaman, a poetry collection.

Critical response
Nandkumar Kamat describes Borkar as being part of the "second generation" of post-(Indian) Independence Konkani poets along with Nagesh Karmali, Shankar Parulkar, Pundalik Naik, Ramesh Veluskar, C. F. (Chafra) da Costa,  Olivinho Gomes, Suresh Borkar, Jesse Fernandes, Prakash Padgaonkar, Kashinath Shamba Lolayenkar and Ramkrishna Zuarkar. In Kamat's listing, he names B.B.Borkar, Manoharrai Sardessai, Abhijit and R.V. Pandit as the post-Independence poets in Konkani who "made major contributions whereas Pandurang Bhangi, Shankar Ramani, Shankar Bhandari [and] Vijaya Sarmalkar began to publish their poems."

Manohararāya Saradesāya (Manoharrai Sardesai) calls his work "terse, abstract yet appealing".

References

External links
Veteran Konkani poet Madhav Borkar took charge of office as the president of Goa Konkani Akademi in Panaji on Monday
Noted Konkani poet Madhav Borkar, on the work of Manohar Rai Sardessai and the new book (in English)
Goa Konkani Akademi President Madhav Borkar speaking during a book release (in Konkani) 
One work on Poetry India
Some Goan Konkani poets
Balcao - Madhav Borkar Celebrates 50 Years of his Poetry

Poets from Goa
Living people
21st-century Indian poets
Konkani-language poets
1954 births
Recipients of the Sahitya Akademi Award in Konkani
Recipients of the Sahitya Akademi Prize for Translation